Euphemia ("well-spoken [of]"), known as the All-praised in the Eastern Orthodox Church, was a virgin, who was martyred for her faith at Chalcedon in 303 AD. 

According to tradition, Euphemia was arrested for refusing to offer sacrifices to Ares. After suffering various tortures, she died in the arena at Chalcedon from a wound sustained from a bear. Her tomb became a site of pilgrimages. She is commemorated on September 16.

Historical background
Euphemia's name and year of death are recorded in the 5th century  Martyrologium Hieronymianum, the earliest extant list of Christian martyrs. The year, 303, was the first year of the Great Persecution under Roman emperor Diocletian. The  Fasti vindobonenses, a collection of liturgical documents from the 4th to 6th centuries, says she died on the 16th of October. Other than this, there is no verifiable historical information about Euphemia. 

Egeria, who made a pilgrimage to the Holy Land about 381-384 and wrote an account of her travels, relates being shown the site of Euphemia's martyrdom in Chalcedon. Euphemia became a famous saint and stories about her accumulated; the Golden Legend, a collection of hagiographies from about 1260, includes an account of her martyrdom.

Hagiography

St. Euphemia lived on the cusp of the 3rd and 4th centuries AD. According to tradition, she was the daughter of a senator named Philophronos and his wife Theodosia in Chalcedon, located across the Bosporus from the city of Byzantium (modern-day Istanbul). From her youth she was consecrated to virginity.

The governor of Chalcedon, Priscus, had made a decree that all of the inhabitants of the city take part in sacrifices to the deity Ares. Euphemia was discovered with forty-nine other Christians hiding in a house and worshipping God, in defiance of the governor's orders. Because of their refusal to sacrifice, they were tortured for a number of days, and then, all but Euphemia, sent to the Emperor for trial. Euphemia, the youngest among them, was separated from her companions and subjected to particularly harsh torments, including the wheel, in hopes of breaking her spirit. She was placed in the arena, where lions were sent out to kill her, but they instead licked her wounds. It is believed that she died of wounds from a wild bear in the arena.

Miracle during the Council of Chalcedon
The Council of Chalcedon, the Fourth Ecumenical Council of the Christian Church, took place in the city of Chalcedon in the year 451. It repudiated the Eutychian doctrine of monophysitism, and set forth the Chalcedonian Definition, which describes the "full humanity and full divinity" of Jesus Christ, the Second Person of the Holy Trinity.

Present at the council were 630 representatives from all the local Christian Churches. The meetings were quite contentious, and no decisive consensus could be reached.

According to the Synaxarion of Constantinople, a collection of hagiographies, both parties wrote a confession of their faith and placed them on the breast of Saint Euphemia within her tomb. After three days the tomb was opened and the scroll with the Orthodox confession was seen in the right hand of St Euphemia while the scroll of the Monophysites lay at her feet.

Relics
 
When the persecution of Diocletian ended, the Christians laid Saint Euphemia's reputed relics in a golden sarcophagus, placed within a church that was dedicated to her. Her relics attracted crowds of pilgrims for centuries. 

Around the year 620, in the wake of the conquest of Chalcedon by the Persians under Khosrau I in the year 617, the relics of Saint Euphemia were transferred to a new church in Constantinople. There, during the persecutions of the Iconoclasts, her reliquary was said to have been thrown into the sea, from which it was recovered by the ship-owning brothers Sergios and Sergonos, who belonged to the Orthodox party, and who gave it over to the local bishop who hid them in a secret crypt. The relics were afterwards taken to the Island of Lemnos, and in 796 they were returned to Constantinople. The majority of her relics are still in the Patriarchal Church of St. George, in Istanbul.

Feast days
The primary feast day of Saint Euphemia, celebrated by both Eastern and Western Christians is September 16 in commemoration of her martyrdom. Additionally, Eastern Orthodox Christians commemorate her miracle at the Council of Chalcedon on July 11.

In popular culture
St. Euphemia is a widely venerated saint among all Eastern Orthodox Christians, not only for her virginity and martyrdom, but also for her strengthening of the Orthodox Faith, and her feast days are celebrated with special solemnity. Churches in her honor have been erected at many places.

See also 
Church of St. Euphemia, Rovinj
630 Euphemia - an asteroid named after St. Euphemia

References

External links

Greatmartyr Euphemia the All-praised Orthodox icon and synaxarion (September 16 feast)
Miracle of the Greatmartyr Euphemia the All-praised at Chalcedon (July 11 feast)
 Saint Euphemia at the Christian Iconography web site
 Here Followeth the Life of S. Eufemia in Caxton's translation of the Golden Legend

3rd-century births
300s deaths
Saints from Roman Anatolia
Burials in Croatia
Virgin martyrs
3rd-century Roman women
4th-century Roman women
4th-century Christian saints
Late Ancient Christian female saints
Legendary Romans
Christians martyred during the reign of Diocletian